{{DISPLAYTITLE:C20H32O2}}
The molecular formula C20H32O2 (molar mass : 304.46 g/mol, exact mass : 304.24023) may refer to:

 Arachidonic acid, a fatty acid
 (C6)-CP 47,497
 5α-Dihydronorethandrolone
 Drostanolone, an anabolic steroid
 Eicosatetraenoic acid, a type of fatty acid
 Mestanolone, a steroid hormone
 Mesterolone, a steroid
 Methandriol, an androstenediol